Alexander Morrison (15 March 1849 – 7 December 1913) was a Scottish Botanist who was the first Government Botanist of Western Australia.

Morrison was born in western Dalmeny, Scotland the 8th of 10 children to Thomas Morrison (1809-1867) and Ann Geggie (1815-1867).  He began a medicine degree at Edinburgh, but suffered from ill health, prompting him to break his studies and visit Australia. He spent two years in Melbourne before returning to Edinburgh to complete his degree. He then undertook post-graduate studies at Glasgow, Würzburg and Vienna.

He returned to Australia in 1877 as a medical officer on a migrant ship. He practiced medicine in Melbourne for 15 years, but again ill health prompted him to travel. He visited the South Seas and spend some time living in the New Hebrides, where he collected plants for Ferdinand von Mueller.

After returning to Australia, he was appointed the first Government Botanist of Western Australia, holding the position from 1897 to 1906. He produced few papers during this time, but these were considered high quality work. Plant taxa published by him include Acacia densiflora, Acacia longispinea, Angianthus acrohyalinus (hook-leaf angianthus), Calandrinia creethae, Calandrinia schistorhiza, Drosera bulbigena (midget sundew), Drosera occidentalis (western sundew), and Indigofera boviperda. He also collected numerous specimens; for example he collected the type specimens for Eucalyptus ebbanoensis and E. platycorys.

Morrison was retrenched in 1906, thereupon returning to medical practice. In 1912 he was appointed assistant botanist to Alfred Ewart at the National Herbarium of Victoria. He died at Cheltenham, Victoria the following year. He bequeathed his herbarium to Edinburgh University, his library to the University of Tasmania, and the remainder of his estate to the University of Melbourne.

Alexander Morrison National Park is named in his honour.

References
 
 
 

1849 births
1913 deaths
Botanists active in Australia
Botany in Western Australia
Scientists from Western Australia
Scottish botanists
Alumni of the University of Edinburgh
People from West Lothian
Scottish emigrants to colonial Australia